The 15th National Congress of the Kuomintang was the fifteenth national congress of the Kuomintang, held in 24–28 August 1997 at Taipei International Convention Center, Taipei, Taiwan.

Details
The congress was attended by 2,300 of the party members elected in the July 1997 election.

Results
The new cabinet was appointed with Vincent Siew as the Premier and started to take office on 1 September 1997.

See also
 Kuomintang

References

1997 conferences
1997 in Taiwan
National Congresses of the Kuomintang
Politics of Taiwan